John Minto (18 November 1887 – c.1963) was a Scottish politician, active in England.

Born in Kilmarnock, Minto left school at the age of 11, and completed an apprenticeship as an engineer, finding work in the shipyards.  He joined the Independent Labour Party (ILP) in 1906, and worked closely with Jimmy Maxton.  He was secretary of the Kilmarnock ILP in 1909, and president in 1910.  During World War I, he served in the Royal Engineers, working on searchlights.

Minto struggled to find work after the war, and relocated to Leicester in 1919, where he served as secretary of the city's unemployed workers' committee.  He later found work with the Leicester Co-operative Society, and joined the Amalgamated Engineering Union.  In 1922, he was elected to Leicester City Council.  He stood for the Labour Party in Bosworth at the 1924 general election, 1927 by-election and 1929 general election, coming only 271 votes from victory in 1927.

During the 1930s, Minto was active in the Socialist Sunday School movement and the Left Book Club.  In 1944, he served as Lord Mayor of Leicester, and in the 1950s he was leader of the Labour group on the council.

References

1887 births
1963 deaths
Labour Party (UK) councillors
Labour Party (UK) parliamentary candidates
Mayors of places in Leicestershire
People from Kilmarnock